György Martos (born 15 October 1943) is a Hungarian speed skater. He competed in two events at the 1968 Winter Olympics.

References

1943 births
Living people
Hungarian male speed skaters
Olympic speed skaters of Hungary
Speed skaters at the 1968 Winter Olympics
Speed skaters from Budapest